Zachariah Jay Stanley (April 16, 1892 – January 23, 1952) was an American attorney and college football and basketball player and coach. He played at Earlham College, and was the head coach of the Maryville Scots in 1914. "He developed a strong football team, which, in the face of numerous injuries, finished the season with a good record." In 1915, he assisted the Florida Gators football team, attending law school at UF.

Head coaching record

References

External links
 

1892 births
1952 deaths
American football ends
Earlham Quakers football players
Florida Gators football coaches
Maryville Scots football coaches
People from Liberty, Indiana
Players of American football from Indiana